Juan Carlos Amorós López (born 3 June 1984) is a Spanish football manager who is currently the head coach of NJ/NY Gotham FC of the American National Women's Soccer League (NWSL). He previously managed NWSL club Houston Dash, Spanish club Real Betis, and English club Tottenham Hotspur.

Managerial career

Tottenham Hotspur
Amorós began his coaching career at Tottenham Hotspur F.C. Women in 2011, as co-manager with Karen Hills. Following the club's promotion to the top-flight Women's Super League after the 2018–19 season, Hills and Amorós signed two-year deals to continue in their roles. However, they were both fired seven matches into the 2019–20 season and replaced with England women's national football team assistant Rehanne Skinner.

Real Betis
On 16 January 2021, Primera Iberdrola club Real Betis Féminas signed Amorós to a contract until 30 June 2021, with an option to extend by one year. However, Amorós and the club mutually ended the contract in May 2022 following a 9th-place finish in the 2021-22 season.

Houston Dash

Following the suspension of head coach and general manager James Clarkson, the Houston Dash appointed assistant coach Sarah Lowdon as acting head coach. On 15 June 2022, the Dash appointed Amorós as the club's new interim head coach pending visa approval. Amorós would not join the team until 12 July while waiting for his visa. In his first match managing the dash on 16 July, with newly acquired striker Ebony Salmon scoring a hat-trick, the Dash under Amorós defeated the Chicago Red Stars 4–1.

Gotham FC
After leading Houston Dash to their first-ever NWSL Playoffs appearance as interim head coach in 2022, Amorós signed on as fellow NWSL club NJ/NY Gotham FC's permanent head coach on a three-year contract in November 2022.

References

External links
 
 

1984 births
Living people
Sportspeople from Madrid
Spanish football managers
Women's association football managers
Women's Super League managers
Houston Dash coaches
Spanish expatriate football managers
Spanish expatriate sportspeople in England
Expatriate football managers in England
Spanish expatriate sportspeople in the United States
Expatriate soccer managers in the United States
Real Betis non-playing staff
Primera División (women) managers
National Women's Soccer League coaches